Grammatostomias is a genus of barbeled dragonfishes found in the Atlantic Ocean.

Species
There are currently 4 recognized species in this genus:
 Grammatostomias circularis Morrow, 1959
 Grammatostomias dentatus Goode & T. H. Bean, 1896
 Grammatostomias flagellibarba Holt & Byrne, 1910
 Grammatostomias ovatus Prokofiev, 2014

References

External links
 Dragonfish

Stomiidae
Marine fish genera
Ray-finned fish genera
Taxa named by George Brown Goode
Taxa named by Tarleton Hoffman Bean